Little Britain is an unincorporated community and census-designated place (CDP) in Little Britain Township, Lancaster County, Pennsylvania, United States. At the 2010 census, the population was 372.

Geography
Little Britain is in far southern Lancaster County, in the center of Little Britain Township. Pennsylvania Route 272 (Nottingham Road) passes through the center of the community, leading northwest  to Lancaster, the county seat, and southeast  to Nottingham in Chester County.

The community drains west to Little Conowingo Creek, a tributary of Conowingo Creek, and south via Reynolds Run to Octoraro Creek. Conowingo and Octoraro creeks are both southwest-flowing tributaries of the Susquehanna River, joining the river in Maryland.

Demographics

References

Census-designated places in Lancaster County, Pennsylvania
Census-designated places in Pennsylvania